Roger Fowler (1938–1999) was a world-renowned and long-serving British Linguist, and was professor of English and Linguistics at the University of East Anglia. He is well known for his works in stylistics. Together with Bob Hodge, Gunther Kress and Tony Trew, he authored the influential book Language and Control, which gave rise to the discipline of critical linguistics. He was educated at University College, London.

His Works 

 An Introduction to Transformational Syntax
 Understanding Language: an Introduction to Linguistics
 Dictionary Of Modern Critical Terms
 Linguistic Criticism
 The Routledge Dictionary Of Literary Terms (by Peter Childs and Roger Fowler)
 Dictionary of Modern Critical Terms
 Linguistics And The Novel
 The Language of George Orwell (Language of Literature)

References

1939 births
1999 deaths
Academics of the University of East Anglia
Linguists from England